Charley Speed (born 28 July 1979) is a British model and actor. He became known in 1997 at the age of 17 when he co-modelled with Kate Moss for a global Calvin Klein advertising campaign. Later that year, he won Male Model of the Year in the prestigious VH1/Vogue Fashion Awards in New York. He has been retained exclusively by Models 1 Agency.

Speed has started a screen career on TV and film. In 2009 he played Brent in Wrong Turn 3. In 2010, he was one of the judges alongside Elle Macpherson in Britain's Next Top Model, Cycle 6.

Speed signed with JAM Agency in 2010, which represents him outside the world of modelling. His agent, James Bulmer believes he has a big future in presenting. Speed appeared in August 2010 on Channel 5 The Wright Stuff, the BBC's Something for the Weekend and on Channel 4's Hollyoaks alongside contestants of Britain's Next Top Model, Cycle 6. In October 2010 he was a guest on Radio 1 with Vernon Kay.  Speed again appeared on The Wright Stuff, as a guest panelist, from Monday, 5 to Friday, 9 September 2011.

Speed is currently filming Britain and Ireland's Next Top Model, Cycle 7.  In this connection, he appeared, in a promotional role, on Channel 5's OK! TV, on Friday, 23 September 2011, along with the competition's two finalists.

Speed made an early New Year return to The Wright Stuff by guesting on it daily, from Monday, 9 to Friday, 13 January 2012 and again from Monday, 2 April to Friday, 6 April 2012.

External links
 Charley Speed official website
 
 Britain and Ireland's Next Top Model judges: Charley Speed
 Models 1: Charley Speed
 RTE Fashion interview with Charley Speed
 Digital Spy interview with Charley Speed
 Seven Feet Apart interview with Charley Speed: The Reinventions of Charley Speed

1979 births
Living people
British male models